South Lockport is a hamlet (and census-designated place) located in the Town of Lockport in Niagara County, New York, United States. The population was 8,234 at the 2010 census. It is part of the Buffalo–Niagara Falls Metropolitan Statistical Area.

South Lockport is south of the City of Lockport on New York State Route 78.

Geography
South Lockport is located at  (43.134057, -78.686132).

Demographics

As of the census of 2000, there were 8,552 people, 3,544 households, and 2,317 families residing in the community. The population density was 1,488.4 per square mile (574.3/km2). There were 3,816 housing units at an average density of 664.1/sq mi (256.2/km2). The racial makeup of the CDP was 91.36% White, 4.89% African American, 0.48% Native American, 1.06% Asian, 0.01% Pacific Islander, 0.54% from other races, and 1.66% from two or more races. Hispanic or Latino of any race were 1.77% of the population.

There were 3,544 households, out of which 33.1% had children under the age of 18 living with them, 46.7% were married couples living together, 15.1% had a female householder with no husband present, and 34.6% were non-families. 29.4% of all households were made up of individuals, and 9.6% had someone living alone who was 65 years of age or older. The average household size was 2.41 and the average family size was 2.98.

In the community, the population was spread out, with 26.3% under the age of 18, 9.1% from 18 to 24, 30.4% from 25 to 44, 23.0% from 45 to 64, and 11.2% who were 65 years of age or older. The median age was 35 years. For every 100 females, there were 89.9 males. For every 100 females age 18 and over, there were 86.5 males.

The median income for a household in the region was $36,410, and the median income for a family was $45,370. Males had a median income of $34,840 versus $24,162 for females. The per capita income for the CDP was $18,945. About 11.0% of families and 12.5% of the population were below the poverty line, including 17.4% of those under age 18 and 6.4% of those age 65 or over.

References

Hamlets in New York (state)
Census-designated places in New York (state)
Buffalo–Niagara Falls metropolitan area
Census-designated places in Niagara County, New York
Hamlets in Niagara County, New York